Tectus architectonicus is a species of sea snail, a marine gastropod mollusk in the family Tegulidae.

Description
The imperforate, whitish shell has a conical shape. The whorls are flat, subimbricating, and longitudinally costate. The ribs are thick, rounded and subnodose. The base of the shell is flat, and concentrically strongly lirate. The columella is short, tortuous, and truncate anteriorly. The margin of the lips is fimbriated.

Distribution
The species occurs off Indo-Malaysia, Oceania, and Western Australia.

References

 Adams, A. 1853. Contributions towards a monograph of the Trochidae, a family of gastropodous Mollusca. Proceedings of the Zoological Society of London 1851(19): 150-192
 Adams, A. 1853. Descriptions of new species of Trochidae. Annals and Magazine of Natural History 2 12: 142-148
 Reeve, L.A. 1861. Conchologia iconica. London : L. Reeve & Co. Vol. 13
 Pilsbry, H.A. 1889. Manual of Conchology. Philadelphia : Academy of Natural Sciences Philadelphia Vol. 11 519 pp., pls 1-67
 Hedley, C. 1916. A preliminary index of the Mollusca of Western Australia. Journal and Proceedings of the Royal Society of Western Australia 1: 152-226
 Odhner, N.H. 1917. Results of Dr E. Mjöbergs Swedish scientific expeditions to Australia. 1910-1913, pt XVII, Mollusca. Kongliga Svenska Vetenskaps-Academiens Nya Handlingar, Stockholm 52(16): 1-115 pls 1-3
 Hedley, C. 1918. Narrative of an expedition of exploration in North Western Australia by Herbert Basedow. Special Report. Mollusca. Transactions of the Royal Geographical Society of Australasia, South Australian Branch 18: 263-283 
 Cernohorsky, W.O. 1978. Tropical Pacific marine shells. Sydney : Pacific Publications 352 pp., 68 pls

External links
 

architectonicus
Gastropods described in 1853